Glendale High School can refer to:
Glendale High School (Glendale, Arizona)
Glendale High School (Glendale, California)
Glendale High School (Missouri), Springfield, Missouri
Glendale High School (Tillsonburg), Tillsonburg, Ontario
Glendale Jr/Sr High School, Glendale, Oregon
Glendale Technology High School, Glendale, New South Wales, Australia

Another school with a similar name:
Glendale Secondary School, Hamilton, Ontario